Stacey Gordon is an American puppeteer from Arizona who is best known for portraying Julia, a four-year-old female Muppet with autism, on the children's television series Sesame Street.
Gordon previously worked as a therapist for children with autism. Her son has autism, and her experiences inform her portrayal of Julia. Gordon uses knowledge from her experiences with autistic children in portraying Julia. Gordon began puppeteering while in high school. She also performs with the Great Arizona Puppet Theater, and is part of an improv duo.

References

Living people
Muppet performers
People from Arizona
American puppeteers
Sesame Street Muppeteers
Year of birth missing (living people)